Port Autonome is a French phrase referring to Autonomous ports and may refer to:

The Autonomous Port of Abidjan, the chief port of Ivory Coast
The Autonomous Port of Cotonou, one of the chief ports of Benin
The Autonomous Port of Dakar, the chief port of Senegal
ASC Port Autonome, a Senegalese football club based in Dakar